Vulgamycin is an antibiotic made by Streptomyces.

References

External links
 Herbicidal activity and mode of action of vulgamycin

Antibiotics